The 1936 Detroit Lions season was the franchise's 7th season in the National Football League.  The team failed to improve on their previous season's output of 7–3–2, losing four games. They failed to qualify for the playoffs.

Schedule

Standings

References

External links 
1936 Detroit Lions at Pro Football Reference
1936 Detroit Lions at jt-sw.com
1936 Detroit Lions at The Football Database

Detroit Lions seasons
Detroit Lions
Detroit Lions